At least two warships of Japan have borne the name Aso:

 launched as the Russian cruiser Bayan in 1900 she renamed after being captured by Japan in 1905. She was struck in 1930 and expended as a target in 1932.
, an  launched in 1944 but never completed. She was expended as a target in 1945.

Japanese Navy ship names
Imperial Japanese Navy ship names